Entre eux deux is the sixth studio album and the first collaborative album by American singer and songwriter Melody Gardot and Brasilian pianist Philippe Powell.

Background
The album was recorded in Paris and offers 10 jazz torch songs mostly written by bandmembers. In contrast to Gardot's previous albums, this record is a more minimalist collection—she has recorded it only with a pianist for accompaniment rather than with a full band, probably for the first time in her career. Track "Samba em Prelúdio" is co-written by Baden Powell who is Philippe Powell's father. The official statement mentions, "This record is a dance between two people who love and value the same things: deep poetry and solid melodies. The title “Entre eux deux” (between us two), stands true. Here’s a peek into the world of two artists who just really dig each other. We hope you really dig it too." 

Gardot and Powell have also created a short video with music to accompany the release. The film is set in and around Paris and at the famous Café de Flore.

Reception
Ivan Hewett of The Daily Telegraph wrote, "And now comes her latest album Entre Eux Deux (“between those two”), beginning with My Foolish Heart – a song that sounds almost too close to her first big hit. It seems the heart is an organ that just will not learn, and these songs dwell on the various ways it can always be flattered and fooled and made sorrowful... The eternally soft nostalgic sweetness could become enervating, but what saves the album is Gardot’s extraordinary voice, which injects an emotional truth even into those songs which aren’t so remarkable in themselves." Javon Anderson of JAZZ.FM91 described the record as "a meticulously crafted, minimalistic album showcasing Gardot’s vocal ability and Powell’s emotive piano style, coming together like a deep conversation between two longtime friends." Jon Clay of Jazzwise commented, "The pair obviously like and admire each other, because there’s a palpable chemistry and connection between the two, which suits the album’s intimate intent supremely well. Gardot sings beautifully in both English and French, her enunciation of the latter tongue pin-perfect, while Powell’s dreamy, Evans-like piano runs – his use of space is exquisitely judged – provide the ideal romantic backdrop to their tête-à-tête. Purists may be unconvinced of course, but let ‘em sneer – this is good stuff, the best album Gardot has yet made. Give it a try, you might like it; and if you’re a fan of brooding torch songs, you’ll probably love it." Thom Jurek of AllMusic added, "The duo's simple presentation allows their melodies and lyrics the full impact of their poetic weight, without artifice."

Track listing

Personnel
Musicians
Melody Gardot – composer, photographer, producer, voices
Philippe Powell – composer, piano, voices

Production
Sebastian Baret – copyist
Pierre Charles Biguet – assistant
Denis Caribaux – engineer, mixing, producing
Simon Gibson – mastering
Bastien Herbin – piano technician
Kyle Kubicek – project manager
Florence Larbey – design

Charts

References

External links

2022 albums
Decca Records albums
Melody Gardot albums
Collaborative albums